Briane Nasimok is a Canadian writer, actor, and director and storyteller. In 2020 he shared the Hamilton Fringe stage with Izzy Ferguson in the two-man storytelling show "Izzy and the Naz". In 2021 his new show "Now Where Was I?" premiered ar the Ottawa Fringe, virtually of course.    

Nasimok appeared in films such as Gas', 'Funny Farm', Tulips, Ticket to Heaven and Hi-Ballin, before turning to a career as a television writer and producer.

Biography
Nasimok graduated from the University of Toronto and began his career appearing with the Canadian Opera Company in non-singing roles. He later toured North America  as the Other Servant in Così fan tutte, and the Head Waiter in La Boheme, performing 287 times without singing. Later, he performed the non-singing role Ambrogio in The Barber of Seville at the Royal Alexandra Theatre in Toronto before his retirement.  His one-person show "Confessions of an Operatic Mute", premiered at the Toronto SouloTheatre Festival in 2013 and played that summer at Totnes England Theatre Festival.  In 2014 the hour-long version played at the Toronto and Winnipeg Fringe Theatre Festivals, followed by a tour which took the show to Halifax, Nova Scotia, Victoria, B.C. and Hamilton Ontario

He wrote for the Toronto Star and the Toronto Sun and was responsible for the guide book Making Out in Toronto (1980).

As a freelancer for United Press International, he covered the Toronto Blue Jays for ten years, including their back to back World Series wins.

Nasimok was the second feature act at Yuk Yuks Komedy Kabaret and appeared on A&E's "Evening at the Improv" and Showtime's "Spectacular Evening in Canada".  He then moved to Theatresports Toronto and was a member of the 1993 Canadian Championship Team.

His theatre credits include "Dead Air" at the Charlottetown. In addition, Nasimok was the founder and artistic director of the Grafton Street Dinner Theatre in Halifax, Nova Scotia.

Nasimok created NBA Dunk Street, Don't Lick the Pig and produced Uh Oh!'', and nanaLa' while writing for the YTV Achievement Awards and YAA to the M@x.

He is currently telling stories online through his monthly series "But That's Another Story".

References

External links
 Yuk Yuks Yuk Yuks

Canadian male comedians
Year of birth missing (living people)
Living people
Canadian Comedy Award winners